Splanchnonema lichenisatum is a species of corticolous (bark-dwelling) lichen in the family Pleomassariaceae. Found in Korea, it was formally described as a new species in 2014 by Dutch lichenologist André Aptroot and Korean lichenologist Kwang-Hee Moon.

It lacks a cortex and does not have a prothallus. Reactions to common chemical spot tests are negative, and no lichen products were detected using thin-layer chromatography. The photobiont partner of the lichen is a trentepohlioid green alga that is about 10 by 5 μm. Two of the most unique characteristics of the species are the presence of kidney-shaped (reniform), compound ascomata, and the lichenisation–which is quite rare in the genus Splanchnonema. Aptroot described it as "clearly, but not heavily, lichenized"; this facultative association of fungus with photobiont has been termed borderline lichen.

References

Pleosporales
Lichen species
Lichens described in 2014
Taxa named by André Aptroot
Lichens of Eastern Asia